This is a list of electoral results for the electoral district of Korong and Eaglehawk in Victorian state elections.

Members for Korong and Eaglehawk

Election results

Elections in the 1940s

 Preferences were not distributed.

Elections in the 1930s

Elections in the 1920s

References

Victoria (Australia) state electoral results by district